

Legend

List

References

 
Timelines of video games
Tactical role-playing